Hazel Vivian Carby (born 15 January 1948 in Okehampton, Devon)  is Professor Emerita of African American Studies and of American Studies. She served as Charles C & Dorathea S Dilley Professor of African American Studies & American Studies at Yale University.

Early life and education 
Hazel Carby was born to Jamaican and Welsh parents in Okehampton, Devon, UK, on 15 January 1948. She earned a BA degree in English and history from Portsmouth Polytechnic in 1970, then a PGCE in 1972, at the Institute of Education, London University. She taught high school from 1972 to 1979, then went back to university, at Birmingham University Centre for Contemporary Cultural Studies, where she gained a M.A (1979) and a Ph.D (1984).

Career 
In 1981, Carby was appointed as a lecturer in the English Department at Yale University (1981–82), after which she taught English at Wesleyan University (1982–89), and rejoined Yale University in 1989. She is now Yale's Charles C & Dorathea S Dilley Professor of African American Studies & American Studies. Her teaching focuses on race, gender and sexuality in Caribbean and diasporic culture and literature; in transnational and postcolonial literature and theory; in representations of the black female body; and in genres of science fiction. Identified as Marxist feminist, her work primarily deals with detecting and probing discrepancies between the symbolic constructions of the black experience and the actual lives of African Americans.

Carby is considered a pioneer in black feminism and is also known as one of the world's leading scholars on race, gender, and African-American issues.  One of her most influential contributions to African Diaspora studies came with her first book, Reconstructing Womanhood: The Emergence of the Afro-American Woman Novelist (1987). Reconstructing Womanhood offers one of the earliest and most comprehensive studies on black female writers including Frances Ellen Watkins Harper, Pauline Elizabeth Hopkins, Anna Cooper, and Ida B. Wells, among others. Carby followed this book with Race Men: The Body and Soul of Race, Nation, and Manhood (1998), a six-essay collection of critiques on historical sites of black masculinity. Her first chapter, "Souls Of Black Men", is a critique of the gender bias in W. E. B. Du Bois' seminal work Souls of Black Folk (1903). Carby argues that Double Consciousness is an erasure of Black female subjectivity. She does not question the importance of this text in black scholarship; she recognizes that because of the crucial status of Du Bois and Souls it is important that she undertakes this critique. After Race Men, she penned Cultures in Babylon: Black Britain and African America (1999). Currently she is working on her forthcoming book, Child of Empire. Carby has lectured at numerous colleges and universities worldwide including the University of Notre Dame, Stanford University, the University of Paris, and the University of Toronto.

Carby serves on the advisory board of multiple feminist academic journals, including Differences, New Formations, and Signs.

Awards
Carby's 2019 book Imperial Intimacies: A Tale of Two Islands (Verso) won the British Academy's 2020 Nayef Al-Rodhan Prize for Global Cultural Understanding.

Personal life
Carby married fellow Yale professor Michael Denning on 29 May 1982.

Bibliography

Books
 Multicultural Fictions, Birmingham: Centre for Contemporary Cultural Studies, University of Birmingham, 1980. , 
 Reconstructing Womanhood: The Emergence of the Afro-American Woman Novelist. New York and Oxford: Oxford University Press, 1987. , 
 Race Men: The W. E. B. Du Bois Lectures. Cambridge, Mass., and London: Harvard University Press, 1998. , 
 Cultures in Babylon: Black Britain and African America. London and New York: Verso, 1999.  
 Imperial Intimacies: A Tale of Two Islands. London: Verso, 2019.

Selected articles

 "Figuring the future in Los(t) Angeles." Comparative American Studies, 1.1 (2003): 19–34.
 "What is This 'Black' in Irish Popular Culture?" European Journal of Cultural Studies, 4.3 (2001): 325–349.
 "Can the Tactics of Cultural Integration Counter the Persistence of Political Apartheid? Or, The Multicultural Wars, Part Two." In Austin Sarat (ed.), Race, Law and Culture: Reflections on Brown v. Board of Education. New York: Oxford University Press, 1997. 221–28.
 "National Nightmares: The Liberal Bourgeoisie and Racial Anxiety." In Herbert W. Harris, Howard C. Blue and Ezra E. Griffith (eds), Racial and Ethnic Identity: Psychological Development and Creative Expression. New York: Routledge, 1995. 173–91.
 "Race and the Academy: Feminism and the Politics of Difference." In Isabel Caldeira (ed.), O Canone Nos Estudos Anglo-Americanos. Coimbra, Portugal: Livraria Minerva, 1994. 247–53.
 "'Hear My Voice, Ye Careless Daughters': Narratives of Slave and Free Women before Emancipation." In William L. Andrews (ed.), African American Autobiography: A Collection of Critical Essays. Englewood Cliffs, NJ: Prentice Hall, 1993. 59–76.
 "The Multicultural Wars." Radical History Review, 54.7 (1992): 7–18.
 "Imagining Black Men: The Politics of Cultural Identity." Yale Review, 80.3 (1992): 186–97.
 "Policing the Black Woman's Body in an Urban Context." Critical Inquiry, 18.4 (1992): 738–55.
 "The Politics of Fiction, Anthropology, and the Folk: Zora Neale Hurston." In Michael Awkward (ed.), New Essays on Their Eyes Were Watching God.  Cambridge: Cambridge University Press, 1991. 71–93.
 "Re-inventing History/Imagining the Future." Black American Literature Forum, 20.2 (1989): 381–87.
 "Proletarian or Revolutionary Literature: C. L. R. James and the Politics of the Trinidadian Renaissance." South Atlantic Quarterly, 87 (1988): 39–52.
 "Ideologies of Black Folk: The Historical Novel of Slavery." In Deborah E. McDowell and Arnold Rampersad (eds), Slavery and the Literary Imagination. Baltimore, MD: Johns Hopkins University Press, 1989. 125–43.
 "The Canon: Civil War and Reconstruction." Michigan Quarterly Review. 28.1 (1989): 35–43.
 "It Jus Be's Dat Way Sometime: The Sexual Politics of Women's Blues." Radical America, 20 (1987): 9–22.
 "'On the Threshold of Woman's Era': Lynching, Empire, and Sexuality in Black Feminist Theory." Critical Inquiry, 12.1 (1985): 262–77.
 "Schooling in Babylon". The Empire Strikes Back: Race and Racism in Seventies Britain. London: Hutchinson, 1982. 182–211.
 "White Woman Listen! Black Feminism and the Boundaries of Sisterhood." The Empire Strikes Back: Race and Racism in Seventies Britain. London: Hutchinson, 1982. 212–235.

Other work 

 "The Limits of Caste". London Review of Books. Vol. 43 No. 2 · 21 January 2021. Related interview for the LRB Podcast here.

References

External links 

 Bio at Stanford
 Bio from Yale University
 Interview from The Minnesota Review

Black studies scholars
American Marxists
African-American feminists
Marxist feminists
Wesleyan University faculty
Yale University faculty
Living people
1948 births
Alumni of the UCL Institute of Education
British feminists
Black British women academics
African-American historians
Gender studies academics
American women historians
20th-century essayists
British emigrants to the United States